Sanjia could refer to the following places in China:

Towns
Sanjia, Yangchun (三甲镇), Guangdong
Sanjia, Dongfang, Hainan (三家镇)
Sanjia, Gaoping (三甲镇), Shanxi
Sanjia, Suining (三家镇), in Anju District, Suining, Sichuan

Townships
Sanjia (三家乡) in Hebei's Chengde County 
Sanjia (三佳乡) in Shanxi's Jiexiu Prefecture

Subdistrict
 Sanjia, Leiyang (三架街道), a subdistrict of Leiyang City, Hunan.